Herbert Terrell Vaningen Jr.  (November 17, 1924 – January 8, 2010) was an American ice hockey goaltender who competed in ice hockey at the 1948 Winter Olympics.

Vaningen was a member of the American ice hockey team which played eight games, but was disqualified, at the 1948 Winter Olympics. Vaningen played in two games as the goaltender.

References

External links

1924 births
2010 deaths
American men's ice hockey goaltenders
Ice hockey players from New York (state)
Ice hockey players at the 1948 Winter Olympics
Olympic ice hockey players of the United States
Sportspeople from Manhattan